Light My Byre is the second album by Scottish band Peat and Diesel, released on 24 January 2020. The album reached number 27 on the UK Albums Chart and got to number 2 on the Scottish Albums Chart, making it the band's most successful album to date.

Track listing
 "Horo Gheallaidh" – 3:24
 "Brandy in the Airidh" – 4:08
 "Dirty Old Town" – 4:13
 "Co Leig A-mach Thu" – 4:11
 "Pirates of the Hebrides" – 3:29
 "Calum Dan's Transit Van" – 3:27
 "Kishorn Commandos" – 3:51
 "Watchakapheep" – 3:17
 "Co-Dhiu Dot Com" – 3:04
 "Spancil Hill" – 4:27
 "Island" – 3:43

Personnel
Boydie MacLeod – vocals, guitar
Innes Scott – accordion
Uilly Macleod – drums

Charts

See also
List of 2020 albums

References

2020 albums